Judge Chambers may refer to:

Richard Harvey Chambers (1906–1994), judge of the United States Court of Appeals for the Ninth Circuit
Robert Chambers (English judge) (1737–1803), chief justice of the Supreme Court of Judicature at Fort William, Bengal
Robert Charles Chambers (born 1952), judge of the United States District Court for the Southern District of West Virginia
Tom Chambers (judge) (1943–2013), associate justice of the Washington State Supreme Court
William Lea Chambers (1852–1933), United States-appointed chief justice of Samoa

See also
 Judge's chambers
 Justice Chambers (disambiguation)